Get Big is a 2017 American comedy-drama film directed by Dylan Anthony Moran, starring Moran and Tanner Stine.

Cast
 Dylan Anthony Moran as Nate
 Tanner Stine as Alec Schaff
 Paulina Alvarez as Amy
Scott Krinsky as Tommy
 Clifford Bañagale as Kahji
 Lisa Alvillar as Maria

Reception
Gary Goldstein of the Los Angeles Times wrote that the film "whips up plenty of humor and charm as well as several organic, well-served life lessons."

Matthew Lickona of the San Diego Reader wrote that the film's "great virtue is its versimilitude, followed by its gently crude humor, its affectionate heart, and its pleasantly surprising degree of polish."

Bradley Gibson of Film Threat rated the film 7 stars out of 10 and called it a "delightful romp with laugh-out-loud moments but also contains serious introspection about what adult life will be like for those now entering into it."

References

External links
 
 

American comedy-drama films
2017 comedy-drama films